The KBS Song Festival is an annual South Korean music show that airs on the Korean Broadcasting System (KBS) at the end of every year. It first aired in 1965 as an awards show, but KBS discontinued the awards ceremony in 2006. It has continued since as a music festival without giving awards most years. However, awards were given in 2013.

History 
 The program was first broadcast in 1965 by the Tongyang Broadcasting Company (TBC), where it was known as the TBC Broadcast Music Awards. Singer Choi Hee-Joon won the first award in 1965. Separate awards were then given for male and female artists from 1966 to 1986

In 1981, the South Korean government forced TBC to merge with the Korean Broadcasting System (KBS). Following the merger, the program's name was changed to the KBS Music Awards. It aired on KBS1 every year on 30 December until 1994, when the program moved to KBS2.

In 2005, Kim Jong-kook became the last singer to win the KBS Music Award. In 2006, the program's name was changed to the KBS Song Festival, and the network turned the program into a non-competitive music festival rather than an awards show.

Between 2006 and 2016, the festival typically featured performances by 20 to 30 K-pop groups and singers. However, in 2017, KBS scaled back the festival to include only eight groups, two singers, and contestants from the KBS2 reality show The Unit.

The event has always taken place at KBS Hall, with two exceptions. In 2015, the event was held in Gocheok Sky Dome and for the 2019 event, it was held in KINTEX.

The 2018 KBS Song Festival with the theme, "A Huge Fantastical Party", was held at the KBS Hall on 28 December 2018.

2021 KBS music festival was held on December 17, from 20:30 KST hosted by Cha Eun-woo, Seolhyun, and Rowoon.

2022 KBS music festival was held on December 16, hosted by Na In-woo, Kim Shing-young and Jang Wonyoung.

Hosts

Award recipients

TBC Broadcast Music Awards (1965–1980)

KBS Music Awards (1981–2005)

KBS Song Festival (Popular Song of the Year)

Performers

KBS Song Festival (2006–present)

See also 
SBS Gayo Daejeon
MBC Gayo Daejejeon

References

External links
 
 2021 KBS Song Festival on Daum

Music Awards
Annual events in South Korea
South Korea annual television specials
Music festivals in South Korea
South Korean music awards